Louis Mexandeau (born 6 July 1931) is a French politician. He served as Minister of the Postal Services from 1981 to 1986 under François Mitterrand, and as Secretary for Veteran Affairs from 1991 to 1993.

Biography
Louis Mexandeau was born on 6 July 1931 in Wanquetin, France. He received the agrégation, and started his career as a teacher. He was a Socialist member of the National Assembly of France from 1973 to 1981, 1986 to 1991, and 1993 to 2002. He was also Minister of the Postal Services from 1981 to 1986, and Secretary of State for Veteran Affairs from 1991 to 1993. He ran for mayor of Caen five times and lost.

Bibliography
Nous, nous ne verrons pas la fin : Un enfant dans la guerre, 1939-1945 (2003)
Histoire du parti socialiste (1905-2005) (2005)
François Mitterrand, le militant : Trente années de complicité (2006)
Histoire de France (2011)

References

|-

|-

1931 births
Living people
Politicians from Caen
People from Pas-de-Calais
Convention of Republican Institutions politicians
Socialist Party (France) politicians
French Ministers of Posts, Telegraphs, and Telephones
Deputies of the 5th National Assembly of the French Fifth Republic
Deputies of the 6th National Assembly of the French Fifth Republic
Deputies of the 7th National Assembly of the French Fifth Republic
Deputies of the 8th National Assembly of the French Fifth Republic
Deputies of the 9th National Assembly of the French Fifth Republic
Deputies of the 10th National Assembly of the French Fifth Republic
Deputies of the 11th National Assembly of the French Fifth Republic